Castanopsis argentea is an evergreen tree native to Indonesia, where it is known as sarangan. It is native to the islands of Java and Sumatra.

Description
Castanopsis argentea is a large tree, growing from 15 to 30 meters high.

The fruits are decorated with branched spines. Flowering occurs most of the year, but usually from March to April. The fruit ripens from February to November, usually May to July.

Distribution and habitat
Castanopsis argentea grows in lowland forests and lower montane forests on Java and Sumatra, from 150 to 1,400 meters elevation. It is mostly found in undisturbed forests of West Java around Mount Gede and Mount Halimun, with a density of ca. 12 trees/hectare. It also occurs in national parks, nature reserves and in high elevation forests in other areas of Java. It is almost extinct from lowland areas in Sumatra, due to the clearance of the land for palm oil plantations.

Plants of the World Online describes a broader range for this species, from Assam in eastern India through Myanmar and Thailand, as well as on Sumatra, Java, and Borneo.

References

argentea
Flora of Java
Flora of Sumatra